Paigham is a 1959 Indian Hindi-language comedy drama film directed by S. S. Vasan. The film stars Dilip Kumar, Vyjayanthimala in lead roles, with Raaj Kumar, Pandari Bai, B. Saroja Devi, Motilal, Johnny Walker in other important roles. The film's music was composed by C. Ramchandra. This was the first time Dilip Kumar and Raaj Kumar appeared in a film together. They later appeared together once again over three decades later for the 1991 film Saudagar. The film was declared a blockbuster at box office.

The film was later remade in Tamil as Irumbu Thirai by Vasan, with Vyjayanthimala and Saroja Devi reprising their roles.

Plot 

The movie traces the lives of the family of a widowed lady, her two sons and daughter.

Mrs. Lal, a widowed lady lives with her two sons, Ram and Ratan, her unmarried daughter, Sheela; Ram's wife, Parvati and her children. Ram works in a mill and Ratan is studying engineering in Calcutta. When Ratan returns, he is offered a job at the same mill, falls in love with a typist named Manju, much to chagrin of Malti, the daughter of the mill-owner, Sewakram.

When Ratan finds out that Sewakram has been defrauding the mill employees, he decides to form a union, a move that is opposed by his brother Ram, who is devoted and loyal to Sewakram. Things go from bad to worse when the workers decide to go on strike, while Ram decides to throw Ratan out of the house. Word gets around that Ratan is against Sewakram, and soon he gets blacklisted.

Sheela who was supposed to marry Kundan, the son of Sitaram, has her marriage cancelled, and the family lose their prestige and credit in the community.

The question remains, will the workers continue to be at the mercy of Sewakram, and will the Lal family be re-united again and is answered during the latter half of the movie.

Cast
 Dilip Kumar as Ratan Lal
 Vyjayanthimala as Manju
 Raaj Kumar as Ram Lal
 Pandari Bai as Parvati
 Motilal as Seth Sevakram
 B. Saroja Devi as Malti
 Johnny Walker as Nandu
 Minoo Mumtaz as Chhallo
 Vasundhara Devi as Manju's Mother
 Pratima Devi as Mrs. Lal
 S. N. Banerjee as Mill Manager
 Mukherjee as Inspector 
 Shivraj as Seetaram
 Seetalaxmi as Sheela 
 Ishwarlal as Jeevan
 Pushpamala as Kamla
 Master Gopi as Bhola
 Kurupaiah as Kundan
 Radha as Seth's Wife
 Madhavan as Sleuth
 Amar as Prosecutor
 Kamal Krishna as Judge

Soundtrack
All songs were music by C. Ramchandra and lyrics by Pradeep.

Accolades 
At the 7th Filmfare Awards, Ramanand Sagar won the Filmfare Award for Best Dialogue, and Raaj Kumar was nominated for Best Supporting Actor.

References

External links
 

1959 films
1950s Hindi-language films
Films directed by S. S. Vasan
Films scored by C. Ramchandra
Gemini Studios films
Hindi films remade in other languages